Covenant Logistics Group, Inc. (formerly Covenant Transport, Inc.) is an American company focused on truckload shipping. The company is headquartered in Chattanooga, Tennessee and is publicly traded on Nasdaq (NASDAQ: CVLG). The company provides temperature controlled trucking, regional delivery, and longhaul team driver delivery.

History
Covenant began operations on January 2, 1986, by founders David and Jacqueline Parker, with 25 trucks and 50 trailers.  The company now jointly operates over 3,000 trucks and 7,000 trailers with sister companies Southern Refrigerated Transport, Inc. (Texarkana, Arkansas), Star Transportation Inc. (La Vergne, Tennessee) and Landair Transportation, Inc. (Greeneville, Tennessee).  The four companies have shared terminals in Chattanooga, Hutchins, Texas, Pomona, California, Texarkana, Arkansas, La Vergne, Allentown, Pennsylvania, Orlando, Florida, and Greenville.

In addition to the four asset-based companies, CTG owns a freight brokerage company, Covenant Transport Solutions, and an accounts receivable factoring company for smaller trucking companies, Transport Financial Solutions, both based in Chattanooga.  CTG has a 49% stake in Transport Enterprise Leasing, a tractor and trailer leasing company that caters to smaller fleets and captive owner-operator programs, in addition to used tractor and trailer sales.

Following its acquisition of Landair Holdings, the company re-named itself from Covenant Transport to Covenant Logistics.

References

External links
Official Website
Company

Companies based in Chattanooga, Tennessee
Trucking companies of the United States
Companies listed on the Nasdaq
Transportation companies based in Tennessee
Transport companies established in 1986
American companies established in 1986
1986 establishments in Tennessee